Stanley G. Tate (born April 25, 1928) is an American real estate developer, founder of Tate Enterprises, Republican party donor, and the creator of the Florida Prepaid College Tuition Program.

Biography
In 1954, he founded Stanley Tate Builders Inc which focused on building houses and apartment buildings; and in 1959, expanded into constructing strip malls, warehouses, and office buildings. In 1969, he established Highpoint of Delray Builders Inc which focused on condominiums. In 1960, he established Investments Diversifed Limited which expanded into real estate activities in South Carolina and non-real estate investments.

Tate has been a Republican since the 1950s and was a personal friend of President George H. W. Bush who named him as Chairman of the National Advisory Board of the Resolution Trust Corporation (RTC), the agency that managed and liquidated banks’ assets during the S&L crisis. Tate was highly critical of President Barack Obama - who vetted him as a possible candidate to lead the Federal Deposit Insurance Corporation.

On June 26, 2006, then Governor Jeb Bush signed House Bill 263 into law renaming the program the Stanley G. Tate Florida Prepaid College Program.

Tate served as president of Temple Israel, the oldest reform synagogue in Miami.

Personal life
In 1949, Tate married Joanne "Joni" Greenwood; they have two sons. Tate is retired and his sons run the company.

External links
 News story on Florida Prepaid
 2016 Florida Statutes, 1009.98 Stanley G. Tate Florida Prepaid College Program

References

Living people
20th-century American Jews
1928 births
American real estate businesspeople
University of Florida alumni
21st-century American Jews